This is the electoral history of Jason Kander, the former Secretary of State of Missouri. He previously served as a member of the Missouri House of Representatives, and was a candidate for the United States Senate.

Missouri House of Representatives elections

2008

2010

Secretary of State of Missouri elections, 2012

United States Senate elections, 2016

References 

Jason Kander
Kander, Jason